The 2009 Pan American Men's Junior Handball Championship took place in Buenos Aires from April 14 – April 18. It acts as the American qualifying tournament for the 2009 Men's Junior World Handball Championship.

Results

Final standing

2009 in handball
Pan American Men's Junior Handball Championship
 Sports competitions in Buenos Aires
H